Drajna may refer to several places in Romania:

 Drajna, a commune in Prahova County
 Drajna Nouă, a village in Dragalina Commune, Călărași County
 Drajna (river), a tributary of the Teleajen in Prahova County